George H. Turner is a New Zealand former professional rugby league footballer who represented New Zealand.

Playing career
From the Papanui club in the Canterbury Rugby League competition, Turner represented Canterbury and the South Island. In 1964 Turner played in one test match for the New Zealand national rugby league team, starting the second match in the series against France. The test was played at Rugby League Park in Turner's home city of Christchurch. Turner had been an unused reserve for the first test and withdrew from the third match due to injury.

Later years
Turner retired in 1966. In his later years he represented North Canterbury in inter-club golf.

References

Living people
New Zealand rugby league players
New Zealand national rugby league team players
Canterbury rugby league team players
Papanui Tigers players
Rugby league props
South Island rugby league team players
Year of birth missing (living people)